Good Thunder is a city in Blue Earth County, Minnesota, United States, situated along the Maple River.  The population was 560 at the 2020 census. It is part of the Mankato–North Mankato Metropolitan Statistical Area.

History

Originally, this area was a part of the Winnebago Reservation from 1855 to 1863. John Graham established a hotel in what is now the town in 1870. When the railroad arrived in Minnesota, the town began as an agricultural commerce center. 

Good Thunder was platted in April 1871, and named for a Winnebago chief (who was also known as Wakuntchapinka). Chief Good Thunder was well known to the early white towns people, and he had converted to Christianity.

The town was incorporated on March 2, 1893.

Geography

Former State Highway 66; and County Roads 1 and 10 are three of the main routes in the community.

Demographics

2010 census
someone living alone who was 65 years of age or older.  The average household size was 2.73 and the average family size was 3.21.
As of the census of 2010, there were 583 people, 227 households, and 155 families living in the city. The racial makeup of the city was 98.1% White, 1.4% African American, 0.2% Native American, and 0.3% from two or more races. Hispanic or Latino of any race were 1.0% of the population.

There were 227 households, of which 36.1% had children under the age of 18 living with them, 53.7% were married couples living together, 8.8% had a female householder with no husband present, 5.7% had a male householder with no wife present, and 31.7% were non-families. 24.2% of all households were made up of individuals, and 7.9% had someone living alone who was 65 years of age or older. The average household size was 2.57 and the average family size was 3.09.

The median age in the city was 34 years. 27.4% of residents were under the age of 18; 7.8% were between the ages of 18 and 24; 29.7% were from 25 to 44; 24% were from 45 to 64; and 10.8% were 65 years of age or older. The gender makeup of the city was 49.4% male and 50.6% female.

2000 census
As of the census of 2000, there were 592 people, 217 households, and 161 families living in the city. The racial makeup of the city was 97.64% White, 0.17% African American, 0.17% Native American, 0.34% Asian, and 1.69% from two or more races.

There were 217 households, out of which 43.8% had children under the age of 18 living with them, 63.6% were married couples living together, 8.3% had a female householder with no husband present, and 25.8% were non-families. 24.0% of all households were made up of individuals, and 12.0% had 
In the city, the population was spread out, with 32.8% under the age of 18, 8.8% from 18 to 24, 31.3% from 25 to 44, 16.4% from 45 to 64, and 10.8% who were 65 years of age or older.  The median age was 31 years. For every 100 females, there were 94.1 males.  For every 100 females age 18 and over, there were 90.4 males.

The median income for a household in the city was $42,500, and the median income for a family was $45,469. Males had a median income of $31,375 versus $21,146 for females. The per capita income for the city was $14,524.  About 12.4% of families and 13.0% of the population were below the poverty line, including 16.7% of those under age 18 and 19.3% of those age 65 or over.

See also
 List of bridges on the National Register of Historic Places in Minnesota

References

Cities in Blue Earth County, Minnesota
Cities in Minnesota
Mankato – North Mankato metropolitan area
1871 establishments in Minnesota